Lisa Durupt is a Canadian-born actress with appearances on several television shows and movies including Heartland and various Hallmark Channel films like Reunited at Christmas.

Early life and career 
Durupt was born and raised in Winnipeg, Manitoba, Canada.

She also founded the Tricities Film Studio run out of Coquitlam which offers a unique sports-oriented approach to the art of acting.

Filmography

Television

Film

References

External links

Official Website

Living people
Actresses from Winnipeg
Canadian film actresses
Canadian television actresses
21st-century Canadian actresses
Year of birth missing (living people)